Pergesa is a monotypic moth genus in the family Sphingidae first described by Francis Walker in 1856. Its only species, Pergesa acteus, the green pergesa hawkmoth, was described by Pieter Cramer in 1779.

Distribution 
It is found in Sri Lanka, India, Nepal, Myanmar, Thailand, eastern and southern China, Taiwan, Japan (the Ryukyu Archipelago), Peninsular Malaysia, Indonesia (Sumatra, Java, Sulawesi) and the Philippines.

Description
The wingspan is 64–80 mm. Head, thorax and abdomen are purplish grey, which differs from Theretra nessus. Vertex of head and a dorso-lateral stripe to thorax and abdomen is green. Forewings are purplish grey with a green oblique central area from below apex to inner margin with some indistinct lines on it. There is an irregular dark outer area with some yellow inside it. Hindwings with anal patch and submarginal band are pointed.

Larvae are greenish with a dark dorsal line, and a subdorsal pale line on thoracic somites. The fourth somite has a large ocellus, which is white ringed with brown and centered with blue and green. The ocelli on the fifth to tenth somites are bluish with yellow centers. Lateral area is greenish and horn is yellowish. The caterpillars feed on Alocasia odora, Syngonium podophyllum, Amorphophallus, Arisaema, Caladium, Colocasia, Dieffenbachia, Begonia, Commelina, Leea, Cissus and Vitis species.

References

Macroglossini
Moths described in 1779
Moths of Japan
Monotypic moth genera
Taxa named by Francis Walker (entomologist)